Taky Marie-Divine Kouamé is a French track cyclist. She participated at the 2022 UCI Track Cycling World Championships, being awarded the gold medal in the women's 500m time trial event with an average speed of 54.820km/h.

In July 2022, at the European U23 Championships, she won three medals, including the title in the 500-meter time trial, where she beat the French record in 33.860 (compared to 33.872 set by Sandie Clair in 2008). In October, she won the elite 500-meter race at the World Championships ahead of Germany's Emma Hinze, improving her French record to 32.835.

References

External links 

Living people
Place of birth missing (living people)
Year of birth missing (living people)
French female cyclists
French track cyclists
UCI Track Cycling World Champions (women)